Behari or Bihari is a village in Muzaffarnagar district, Uttar Pradesh India. It comes under Tehsil Jansath, Uttar Pradesh. It is located 10 km from Muzaffarnagar city  
This village is inhabited by Shia Sayyids. Shia Sayyids of this village are Zaidi who came to India from Iran.
Behari is a very old village. Behari is located in Uttar Pradesh the north-western part of India, about 120 km from the National Capital of Delhi.

See also
 Bihari (disambiguation)
 Bahariyeh (disambiguation)